In linguistics, a determiner is a class of words that includes articles and other words that function in the place of articles.

Determiner may also refer to:

 Determiner (cuneiform), a symbol specifying that the associated word belongs to a particular semantic group
 Determiner phrase, a phrase starting with a determiner.

See also